Amanislo was a king of Kush dating to the middle of the third century BCE.

Monuments and inscriptions

Amanislo is mainly known from his pyramid at Meroë. He is buried in Meroe, Beg. S 5. From the position of his pyramid it has been argued that he was the successor of king Arakamani and the predecessor of Amantekha.

He is also known from an inscription on a granite lion figure, originally belonged to the Egyptian pharaoh Amenhotep III and now at the British Museum. There is also a column drum, found at Semna perhaps providing his name, although the reading is uncertain.

In modern culture
Amanislo appears as Amonasro, King of Ethiopia in Verdi's Aida, following the scenario written by Auguste Mariette.

References

Literature
 Laszlo Török, in: Fontes Historiae Nubiorum, Vol. II, Bergen 1996, p. 568-569, 

3rd-century BC monarchs of Kush
History of Sudan
3rd-century BC rulers